Ain Farah is an archaeological site in Darfur in western Sudan. It was at one time the capital of the last Tunjur ruler, Shau Dorshid. It comprises large-scale area of stone and brick walls. It has been visited or described many times. There is a brick and stone edifice which appears to have served as a mosque, a large stone group which may have served as a public building, and a main group on the highest point of the ridge, described variously as a royal residence or military defence.

Geography
The region is picturesque, with relatively fertile hills and spring sources. Date palms thrive in the lakes. From there, the access goes through a dry valley, which was previously secured in the back by a wall.

Archaeology 
Archaeological work is in early stages.  A survey of a sample of houses and excavation of a grave was undertaken by Ibrahim Musa Mohammed (1986) during his survey of Darfur. The grave contained a flexed burial and over 200 iron beads, an ostrich eggshell necklace, a perforated cowrie shell, and iron jewellery. One of the corroded iron objects yielded a surprisingly early date (1500 +/- 200 bp, Q 3155), falling at least six and perhaps as many as eleven centuries before the likely time of the Tunjur; Mohammed interprets this as signifying a pre-Islamic presence and continuation into Islamic times. Christian Nubian pottery has been found at the site in the ruins of a brick-built monastery.

References

Archaeological sites in Sudan
1986 archaeological discoveries